The Swan class were built as a 14-gun class of ship sloops for the Royal Navy, although an extra two guns were added soon after completion.

Design
The class was designed by the Surveyor of the Navy, John Williams, and two vessels to this design (Swan and Kingfisher) were ordered in January 1766. Twenty-three more were ordered to the same design between 1773 and 1779; they formed the 'standard' ship sloop design of the British Navy during the American Revolutionary War, during which eleven of them were lost. Surviving vessels went on to serve during the French Revolutionary War and Napoleonic War.

The design provided for 16 gunports (8 per side, excluding the bridle-ports) but one pair was initially left unoccupied, and the ships were always rated at 14 guns. However an eighth pair of guns was added from 1780 onwards to utilise the vacant ports, without any change in the nominal rating.

The Swan class sloops were unusually attractive for the type of vessel. Not only did they have sleek hull lines but they also carried an unusual amount of decoration for their size. They were built just before the Admiralty issued orders that all vessels (especially lesser rates and unrated vessels) should have minimal decoration and carvings to save on costs, due to the seemingly ever-continuing war with France and other nations.

Construction

Following the initial 1766 order for two ships, a second pair was ordered in 1773 (Cygnet and Atalanta) and a further five in 1775 (Pegasus in April, Fly in August, and Swift, Dispatch and Fortune in October); all these were built in the Royal Dockyards. Another five were contracted in November 1775 to be built by commercial shipbuilders (Hound, Hornet, Vulture, Spy and Cormorant), and a further pair during 1776 (Zebra and Cameleon). Another two were ordered from the Royal Dockyards in January 1777 (Fairy and Nymph) and a final seven from commercial constructors over the following 30 months (Savage, Fury, Delight and Thorn during 1777, Bonetta and Shark during 1778,  and Alligator in 1779).

Ships

References 
British Warships in the Age of Sail: 1714-1792, Rif Winfield, Seaforth Publishing, 2007. 
British Warships in the Age of Sail: 1793-1817, Rif Winfield, Seaforth Publishing, 2007. 

 
Sloop classes